United Nations Security Council Resolution 456, adopted on 30 November 1979, considered a report by the Secretary-General regarding the United Nations Disengagement Observer Force.  The Council noted its efforts to establish a durable and just peace in the Middle East but also expressed its concern over the prevailing state of tension in the area.

The Resolution decided to call upon the parties concerned to immediately implement Resolution 338 (1973), it renewed the mandate of the Observer Force for another 6 months until 31 May 1980 and requested that the Secretary-General submit a report on the situation at the end of that period.

The resolution was adopted with 14 votes to none; China did not participate in the voting.

See also
 Arab–Israeli conflict
 Golan Heights
 Israel–Syria relations
 List of United Nations Security Council Resolutions 401 to 500 (1976–1982)

References
Text of the Resolution at undocs.org

External links
 

 0456
 0456
 0456
Israel–Syria relations
Middle East peace efforts
November 1979 events